The 2023 Martyr's Memorial A-Division League (Nepali: शहीद स्मारक ए डिभिजन लिग २०७९) is the 45th edition of the Martyr's Memorial A-Division League  since its establishment in 1954/55. A total of 14 teams are competing in the league.

The league was scheduled to begin on 10 January 2023 but was pushed back to begin on 3 March 2023 due to a conflict between the All Nepal Football Association and the clubs regarding up-front payments.

Participating teams
The following 14 teams will compete in the Martyr's Memorial A-Division League in the 2022–23 season, with 12 teams from the previous season and Church Boys United and FC Khumaltar promoted from the 2022 B-Division League.

Location

Personnel and kits

Foreign players 
All Nepal Football Association has allowed a maximum of four foreign players including two from Asian country per team.

Venues
The league is scheduled to be played in two cities in the Kathmandu Valley.

League table 
<onlyinclude>

Results

1st Round

2nd Round

Positions by round

Results by games

Season statistics

Scoring

Top Goal Scorers 
As of 18 March 2023

Clean Sheets 
As of 18 March 2023

Awards

End-of-Season Awards

Notes

References 

Martyr's Memorial A-Division League seasons